is a Japanese former footballer and manager.

Playing career
Kageyama was born in Iwaki on May 23, 1967. After graduating from University of Tsukuba, he joined Furukawa Electric (later JEF United Ichihara) in 1990. He became a regular player as center back from 1991. He moved to Urawa Reds in 1995. However he could not play in the match and moved to Japan Football League club Brummell Sendai in 1996. He retired end of 1996 season.

Coaching career
After retirement, Kageyama served as technical staff for Japan national team. In 2001, he signed with Sanfrecce Hiroshima and became a coach. In 2006, he moved to Macau and became a manager for Macau national team. In 2008, he moved to Singapore and became a manager for Singapore U-16 national team. Although he managed at 2008 AFC U-16 Championship, U-16 Singapore lost all 3 matches. In 2009, he returned to Japan and signed with newly was promoted to J2 League club, Fagiano Okayama. He became a coach in 2009, and a manager as Satoshi Tezuka successor in 2010. He managed the club until 2014. In 2017, Kageyama became a manager for Japan U-20 national team. U-20 Japan won the 3rd place at 2018 AFC U-19 Championship and qualified for 2019 U-20 World Cup.

Club statistics

Managerial statistics

References

External links
 
 

1967 births
Living people
University of Tsukuba alumni
Association football people from Fukushima Prefecture
Japanese footballers
Japan Soccer League players
J1 League players
Japan Football League (1992–1998) players
JEF United Chiba players
Urawa Red Diamonds players
Vegalta Sendai players
Japanese football managers
Expatriate football managers in Macau
Macau national football team managers
J2 League managers
Fagiano Okayama managers
Association football defenders
Japanese expatriate sportspeople in Macau
Japanese expatriate football managers
Japanese expatriate sportspeople in Singapore
Expatriate football managers in Singapore